Morris P. Fiorina (born 1946) is an American political scientist and co-author of the book Culture War? The Myth of a Polarized America with Jeremy C. Pope (Brigham Young University).

Biography
Fiorina received his B.A. from Allegheny College, and his M.A. and Ph.D. from the University of Rochester. He currently serves as the Wendt Family Professor of Political Science, Stanford University and is a senior fellow at Stanford University's Hoover Institution. He was formerly the Thompson Professor of Government at Harvard University and has taught at the California Institute of Technology. He resides in Portola Valley, California.

Selected works
 Disconnect: The Breakdown of Representation in American Politics
 Culture War? The Myth of a Polarized America
 Congress: Keystone of the Washington Establishment
 Divided Government
 America's New Democracy
 Personal Vote
 Retrospective Voting in American National Elections

References

External links
 Home Page at Stanford University
 Hoover Institution Bio Page
 What Culture Wars? The essay published in Hoover Digest, which would eventually be adapted into the book "Culture War? The Myth of a Polarized America."
 
 

American political scientists
1946 births
Living people
Stanford University Department of Political Science faculty
Harvard University faculty
University of Rochester alumni
Members of the United States National Academy of Sciences
People from Portola Valley, California